This is a list of Chinese folk songs, categorized by region.

Hunan 
 La Meizi

Jiangsu 
 Mo Li Hua
 The Good Scenery of Suzhou (苏州好风光)
 Scenery of Wuxi (无锡景）
 Beautiful Lake Tai (太湖美)
 Lady Meng Jiang
 Yangtze River Boatmen

Northeastern China 
 Northeastern Cradle Song(东北摇篮曲)

Sichuan 
 Kangding Love Song (康定情歌)

Shaanxi 
 Xin Tian You

Xinjiang 
 Lift Your Veil (掀起你的蓋頭來)

References

!